Labros Papakostas (born 20 October 1969 in Karditsa) is a retired Greek high jumper who won two silver medals at the World Indoor Championships in 1995 and 1997.

His personal best, achieved in Athens in 1992, was 2.36 metres, when he took the Greek national record from Panagiotis Kontaxakis.

He is an eight-time national champion for Greece in the men's high jump event.

Achievements

External links

1969 births
Living people
Greek male high jumpers
Athletes (track and field) at the 1992 Summer Olympics
Athletes (track and field) at the 1996 Summer Olympics
Olympic athletes of Greece
Athletes (track and field) at the 1991 Mediterranean Games
Mediterranean Games competitors for Greece
Athletes from Karditsa